Solenopsis tennesseensis is a species of ant in the family Formicidae.

References

tennesseensis
Articles created by Qbugbot
Insects described in 1951